Pyropteron doryliformis, the dock clearwing or dock moth, is a moth of the family Sesiidae. It is found in south-west Europe, North Africa and Australasian realm.

The wingspan is about 20 mm.

The larvae feed on Rumex (dock). In 1997, it was introduced into Tasmania and subsequently monitored as a possible biological control against dock.

Subspecies
Pyropteron doryliformis doryliformis
Pyropteron doryliformis icteropus (Zeller, 1847)

References

External links

Global Biodiversity Information Facility
Lepiforum.de

Moths described in 1808
Sesiidae
Moths of Europe
Taxa named by Ferdinand Ochsenheimer